The Women's pole vault event at the 2013 European Athletics Indoor Championships was held on March 1, 2013 at 17:15 (qualification) and March 2, 16:10 (final) local time. The gold medal was won by British athlete Holly Bleasdale, who beat defending champion Anna Rogowska in a jump-off.

Records

Results

Qualification
Qualification: Qualification Performance 4.56 (Q) or at least 8 best performers advanced to the final.

Final
The final was held at 16:10.

References

Pole vault at the European Athletics Indoor Championships
2013 European Athletics Indoor Championships
2013 in women's athletics